Brandon is a small village in South Kesteven, south Lincolnshire, England, part of the civil parish of Hough-on-the-Hill (where the population is listed).

The village is also part of the ecclesiastical parish of Hough on the Hill, part of the Loveden Deanery of the Diocese of Lincoln. There is a chapel of ease dedicated to St John the Evangelist, linked to the main church at Hough.

Geography
It is situated between Stubton and Caythorpe, just west of the River Brant, from which the village gets its name.

The village's placename is likely derived in part from the name of the river, and thus means "hill by the River Brant". The placename is thus composed of two Old English elements: brant (meaning "steep", "deep") and dūn (meaning "hill").

History
A notable building is Brandon Old Hall, built in the 16th century. Built of coursed dark gold bands of ironstone, light gold bands of ironstone, narrow bands of blue lias with limestone ashlar dressings.  The garden is walled in the same unique style.

Medieval earthworks of a toft (homestead with land), a hollow way and some boundaries have been identified around the existing village.

The church, or chapel, was restored in 1872 by Kirk of Sleaford. It includes fragments of Saxon stonework whose origin is uncertain, and a Norman door. The style is Early English with Decorated and Perpendicular features.

Businesses
A racing circuit (PF International) designed for single-seat karts is 1 mile to the north. British, European and Karting World Championship were held there.

References

External links

 Brandon Village Website
 Trent Valley Kart Club
 Loveden Website (local information and history)

Video clips
 Karting circuit
 Race track

Villages in Lincolnshire
South Kesteven District